One Froggy Evening is a 1955 American Technicolor animated musical short film written by Michael Maltese and directed by Chuck Jones, with musical direction by Milt Franklyn. The short, partly inspired by a 1944 Cary Grant film entitled Once Upon a Time involving a dancing caterpillar in a small box, marks the debut of Michigan J. Frog. This popular short contained a wide variety of musical entertainment, with songs ranging from "Hello! Ma Baby" and "I'm Just Wild About Harry", two Tin Pan Alley classics, to "Largo al Factotum", Figaro's aria from the opera Il Barbiere di Siviglia. The short was released on December 31 1955 as part of Warner Bros.' Merrie Melodies series of cartoons.

In 1994, it was voted  of The 50 Greatest Cartoons of all time by members of the animation field. In 2003, the United States Library of Congress deemed the film "culturally, historically, or aesthetically significant", and selected it for preservation in the National Film Registry.

The film is included in the Looney Tunes Golden Collection: Volume 2 DVD box set (Disc 4), along with an audio commentary, optional music-only audio track (only the instrumental, not the vocal), and a making-of documentary, It Hopped One Night: A Look at "One Froggy Evening". It was also attached to the theatrical release of Little Giants in 1994 and was subsequently featured on that film's VHS release.

Plot 
A mid-1950s construction worker involved in the demolition of the "J. C. Wilber Building" pries off the top of the cornerstone and finds a metal box within. The unnamed man opens the box and finds, along with a commemorative document dated April 16, 1892, a live frog inside with an appropriately-sized top hat and cane. After the frog suddenly performs a musical number, the man sees an opportunity to cash in on the frog's anthropomorphic talents and sneaks away from the site with the frog in the box under his arm.

Every attempt the man makes to exploit the frog fails: the frog will perform only for his owner alone; in front of anyone else, he is an ordinary croaking frog. When he does perform, he finishes each song and instantly devolves into his ordinary state before the man can show anyone else his talent. Remaining unaware of this reality, the man first takes the frog to a talent agent. After getting kicked out due to the frog's apparent inability to act, he uses all of his life savings to rent an abandoned theater to showcase the frog on his own. The frog performs atop a high wire behind the closed curtain while the man struggles to get an audience, succeeding with the promise of "Free Beer". As the curtain begins rising, the frog winds down the song and, by the time he is fully revealed to the crowd, he has again reverted to being an ordinary frog. The booing crowd pelts the man with rotten vegetables.

As a result of these failures, the man is now homeless and living on a park bench, where the frog still performs only for him. A policeman overhears the singing and approaches the man, who points to the frog as the singer. When the frog again presents himself as ordinary, the policeman arrests the man for disturbing the peace and has him committed to a psychiatric hospital along with the frog, who continues serenading the hapless patient. Following his release, the now haggard and destitute man, still carrying the box with the frog inside, notices the construction site where he originally found the box and happily dumps it into the new cornerstone for the future "Tregoweth Brown Building" before running away, overjoyed to finally get rid of what has become his burden.

In 2056, a century later, the Brown Building is itself being demolished using futuristic tools. The box with the frog is discovered again by a 21st-century demolition man who, after also envisioning a cash bonanza, absconds with the frog, beginning the cycle anew.

Production notes 
The cartoon has no spoken dialogue or vocals except by the frog.  The frog's vocals are provided by singer and bandleader Bill Roberts. The frog had no name when the cartoon was made, but Chuck Jones later named him Michigan J. Frog after the song "The Michigan Rag", which was written for the cartoon. Jones and his animators studied real-life frogs to achieve the successful transition from an ordinary frog to a high-stepping entertainer. The character became the mascot of The WB television network in the 1990s. In a clip shown in the DVD specials for the Looney Tunes Golden Collection, Jones states that he started calling the character "Michigan Frog" in the 1970s. During an interview with writer Jay Cocks, Jones decided to adopt "J" as the Frog's middle initial, after the interviewer's name.

Sequel 
In 1995, Chuck Jones reprised Michigan J. Frog in a cartoon titled Another Froggy Evening, with Jeff McCarthy providing the frog's voice. In Another Froggy Evening, Michigan is shown to have always existed. Men from the Stone Age (during the erection of Stonehenge), Roman Empire, and American colonies, all of whom resemble the man from the original short, fail to profit off the singing frog, who still performs early 20th-century-style showtunes. In some shots, the frog displays a degree of anthropomorphism, but not musical talent, in front of others by willingly hiding himself in his box. Finally, just as Michigan is about to be eaten by a starving man deserted on an island, he is abducted by Marvin the Martian, who discovers the frog understands the Martian language. The frog invites Marvin to hear him sing, and they perform a duet as the spaceship flies away.

Inspirations 
The premise of One Froggy Evening has some similarity to that of the 1944 Columbia Pictures film Once Upon a Time starring Cary Grant in which a dancing caterpillar is kept in a shoebox. It was common for Warner Bros. to parody scenes from well-known live action films for its Merrie Melodies productions. Once Upon a Time, in turn, was based on "My Client Curley", a 1940 radio play adapted by Norman Corwin from a magazine story by Lucille Fletcher. Ol' Rip, a horned toad "discovered" in an 1897 time capsule inside the cornerstone of the Eastland County, Texas courthouse in 1928, is also said to have inspired the premise.

Some of the Frog's physical movements are evocative of ragtime-era greats such as Bert Williams, who was known for sporting a top hat and cane, and performing the type of flamboyant, high-kick cakewalk dance steps demonstrated by the frog in Hello! Ma Baby. Williams was also a prominent figure in The Frogs club.

Reception 
Film critic Jay Cocks said that the short "comes as close as any cartoon ever has to perfection" in a 1973 Time profile of Chuck Jones. In the 2000 documentary film Chuck Jones: Extremes & Inbetweens – A Life in Animation, filmmaker Steven Spielberg called the short "the Citizen Kane of the animated short".

In 1994, it was voted  of The 50 Greatest Cartoons of all time by members of the animation field.

Songs featured 
About half of the songs performed by the frog were written after he was presumably sealed into the cornerstone, dated 1892.
 "Hello! Ma Baby"
Words and music by Ida Emerson and Joseph E. Howard (1899)
 "The Michigan Rag"
Words and music by Milt Franklyn, Michael Maltese, and Chuck Jones, written for the cartoon
 "Come Back to Éireann"
Words and music by Claribel (pseudonym of Charlotte Alington Barnard) (1866)
 "I'm Just Wild About Harry"
Words and music by Eubie Blake and Noble Sissle, written for the musical Shuffle Along (1921)
 "Throw Him Down, McCloskey"
Words and music by John W. Kelly (1890)
 "The Michigan Rag" reprise
 "Won't You Come Over To My House"
Words by Harry Williams, music by Egbert Van Alstyne (1906)
 "Largo al factotum"
Composed by Gioachino Rossini for the opera The Barber of Seville (1816)
 "Please Don't Talk About Me When I'm Gone"
Words and music by Sidney Clare, Sam H. Stept, and Bee Palmer (1930)
 "Hello! Ma Baby" reprise

In Popular Culture 

 Michigan J. Frog appears in an episode of the Warner Bros. series Tiny Toon Adventures, falling into Hamton J. Pig's possession.
 The frog cameos in an episode of Animaniacs when a scene from Macbeth is recreated. He is placed into a boiling cauldron along with other cartoon characters.

See also 
Entombed animal
Ol' Rip the Horned Toad, said to be the original inspiration for the cartoon

References

External links 

 One Froggy Evening essay  by Craig Kausen on the National Film Registry website
 
 Details and credits for One Froggy Evening
 The Songs of One Froggy Evening
 One Froggy Evening essay by Daniel Eagan in America's Film Legacy: The Authoritative Guide to the Landmark Movies in the National Film Registry, A&C Black, 2010 , pages 509-510 

1950s English-language films
1955 animated films
1955 short films
1955 musical comedy films
American musical comedy films
Short films directed by Chuck Jones
Films set in 1955
Films set in 2056
Merrie Melodies short films
United States National Film Registry films
Films scored by Milt Franklyn
Animated films about frogs
Films with screenplays by Michael Maltese
1950s Warner Bros. animated short films
American comedy short films
Films produced by Edward Selzer